Yaroslav Serdyuk ; born in Chernihiv, March 39, 1962) is a retired Soviet football player and Ukrainian midfielder. He spend most of his career to Desna Chernihiv the main club in Chernihiv.

Career
Yaroslav Serdyuk. started his career in 2007 in Yunist Chernihiv. He moved to Desna Chernihiv, the main club in Chernihiv, here he played 65 matches and scored 2 goals.

In 2010 he moved to FC Sevastopol-2, where he played 10 goals and he scored 1 goal and he moved to the main team FC Sevastopol. After that he returned to Desna Chernihiv, where he played 16 matches. In 2012 he moved to FC Yednist' Plysky, where he played 19 matches, and to Zhemchuzhina Yalta. In 2014, he returned to Desna Chernihiv, where he played only 1 match.

In 2015 he moved YSB Chernihiv, the second main team of Chernihiv, without playing and in 2017 he played for the same team just renamed FC Chernihiv, with 6 caps.

References

External links 

1990 births
Living people
Footballers from Chernihiv
Ukrainian footballers
FC Desna Chernihiv players
FC Yunist Chernihiv players
FC Sevastopol players
FC Chernihiv players
FC Yednist Plysky players
FC Zhemchuzhyna Yalta players
Association football midfielders